Seegert is a surname of German origin. Notable people with the surname include:

Alicia Seegert (born 1965), American softball player
Marcel Seegert (born 1994), German footballer
Nolan Seegert (born 1992), German pair skater

References

Surnames of German origin